Neunkirchen is a municipality in the district of Neckar-Odenwald-Kreis, in Baden-Württemberg, Germany. It is located near Mosbach.

References

Neckar-Odenwald-Kreis